Melanocortin 5 receptor (MC5R) is a protein that in humans is encoded by the  gene. It is located on the chromosome 18 in the human genome. When the MC5R was disrupted in transgenic mice, it induced disruption of their exocrine glands and resulted in decreased production of sebum.

Physiology

MC5R is necessary for normal sebum production. Stimulation of MC5R promotes fatty acid oxidation in skeletal muscle and lypolysis in adipocytes. MC5R is essential for erythrocyte differentiation. MC5R is involved in inflammation. MC5R helps maintain thermal homeostasis.

MC5R is expressed in the brain at different levels depending on physical activity.

Pheromones 

MC5R is heavily expressed in the preputial gland in mice (a modified sebaceous gland involved in pheromone production). MC5R deficiency in male mice decreases aggressive behavior, promotes defensive behavior and encourages other male mice to attack MC5R-deficient males through pheromonal signals.

MRAP

Melanocortin 2 receptor accessory protein (MRAP) traps MC5R protein inside cells.

See also 
 Melanocortin receptor

References

Further reading

External links 
 

G protein-coupled receptors
Human proteins